The SAFA (Safety Assessment of Foreign Aircraft) Programme was initially launched by the European Civil Aviation Conference (ECAC) in 1996. The Programme was not based upon a European legal binding basis but upon a commitment of the Directors General of the participating ECAC Member States. The scope of the inspections performed on ‘foreign’ aircraft involved those aircraft that were not used or operated under the control of the inspecting competent authority. The SAFA was implemented to maintain a well-functioning and reliable air transportation system.

Historical overview 

On 30 April 2004, the Directive 2004/36/CE of the European Parliament and of the council on the safety of third-country aircraft using Community airports (the so-called 'SAFA Directive') was published, creating a legal obligation upon EU Member States to perform ramp inspections on third-country aircraft landing at their airports, where ‘third country aircraft’ implied aircraft not used or operated under control of a competent authority of an EU Member State. Nevertheless, the Directive didn't prohibit in any way EU Member States from inspecting aircraft from other EU Member States. EU Member States were provided with a transition period of two years for transposing and implementing the above-mentioned Directive.

Until 2006, the operational elements of the SAFA Programme were implemented by the Central Joint Aviation Authorities (CJAA). At the end of 2006, the SAFA coordination activities, including the centralised database, have been transferred from CJAA to EASA.

As of 1 January 2007, following a decision by the Directors General of ECAC Member States, the SAFA Programme was transferred under European Community (EC) competence and the responsibility for the management and further development of the EU SAFA Programme falls upon the European Commission assisted by the European Aviation Safety Agency (EASA).

The continued participation of the 15 non-EU ECAC Member States, and thus the pan-European dimension of the programme, has been assured through the signature of Working Arrangements between each of these individual States and EASA.

In the last 4 years, similar Working Arrangements have been signed with several non-European States (Morocco, United Arab Emirates, Canada, Singapore and Israel) and a further non-EU ECAC Member State (Montenegro).

On 28 October 2012, the Implementing Rules on Air Operations entered into force as the new legal basis for the EU ramp inspection programme, replacing the original system established by the SAFA Directive and its implementing regulations with a new system represented by the new EU Ramp Inspections Programme.

The EU Ramp Inspection Programme is a European Programme regarding the performance of ramp inspections on aircraft used by third country operators (SAFA) or used by operators under the regulatory oversight of another EU Member State (SACA).

The Programme is regulated by Commission Regulation (EU) No 965/2012 and it provides for the inspection of aircraft suspected (based on e.g. safety relevant information collected by the Participating States or on regular analysis of the centralised database performed by EASA) of non-compliance with the applicable requirements (either international safety standards or EU standards). Ramp inspections may also be carried out in the absence of any suspicion, in this case a spot-check procedure is being used.

The applicable legal framework of the Programme contains the following:
 Commission Regulation (EU) No 965/2012 of 5 October 2012;
 Acceptable Means of Compliance (AMC) and Guidance Material (GM) to Part-ARO, consolidated version, issue 3, 28 July 2014; and
 Inspection Instructions on the Categorisation of Ramp Inspection (SAFA/SACA) Findings – INST.RI.01/002 approved on 18 November 2015.
The EU Ramp Inspection Programme has replaced the EU SAFA Programme and has two major components:
 SAFA ramp inspections (for third country operators); and
 SACA ramp inspections (for community operators – checked against EU standards).
In each Participating State, aircraft of operators under the safety oversight of another Member State or of a third country can be subject to a ramp inspection, chiefly concerned with the aircraft documents and manuals, flight crew licenses, the apparent condition of the aircraft and the presence and condition of mandatory cabin safety equipment. The applicable requirements for these inspections are:
 The ICAO international standards for aircraft used by third country operators;
 The relevant EU requirements for aircraft used by operators under the regulatory oversight of another Member State;
 Manufacturers’ standards when checking the technical condition of the aircraft; and
 Published national standards (e.g. Aeronautical Information Publications (AIPs)) that are declared applicable to all operators flying to that State.
These checks are carried out in accordance with a procedure which is common to all the Participating States. Their outcome is then subject to reports which also follow a common format.

In case of significant irregularities, the operator and the appropriate Aviation Authority (State of Operator or State of Registry) are contacted in order to arrive at corrective measures to be taken not only with regard to the aircraft inspected, but also with regard to other aircraft which could be concerned in the case of an irregularity which is of a generic nature. All data from the reports as well as supplementary information are shared and centralised in a computerised database set up and managed by EASA.

The main features of the EU Ramp Inspection Programme can be summarised as follows:
 its application by all Participating States – notably all ECAC States (EU Member States, non-EU ECAC States as well as non-EU States that have signed the EASA Working Arrangements);
 the broad dissemination of inspection results through a centralised database;
 its bottom-up approach: the programme is built around ramp inspections of aircraft;
 non-discriminatory approach: obligation for the participating EU Member States, that in addition to third country aircraft, to inspect EU aircraft as well, on the basis of the EU requirements;
The 47 Participating States engaged in the EU Ramp Inspections Programme are: Albania, Armenia, Austria, Belgium, Bosnia and Herzegovina, Bulgaria, Canada, Croatia, Cyprus, Czech Republic, Denmark, Estonia, Finland, France, Georgia, Germany, Greece, Hungary, Iceland, Ireland, Israel, Italy, Latvia, Lithuania, Luxembourg, Malta, Republic of Moldova, Monaco, Montenegro, Morocco, Netherlands, Norway, Poland, Portugal, Romania, Serbia, Singapore, Slovak Republic, Slovenia, Spain, Sweden, Switzerland, The former Yugoslav Republic of Macedonia, Turkey, Ukraine, United Arab Emirates and United Kingdom.

However, ramp inspections are limited to on-the-spot assessments and cannot substitute for proper regulatory oversight, thus, they cannot guarantee the airworthiness of a particular aircraft. Where irregularities have an immediate impact on safety, inspectors can demand corrective actions before they allow the aircraft to leave.

Stakeholders 
The European Commission and Participating States are informed of any potentially safety hazards identified. They come together with EASA and Eurocontrol regularly in the Air Safety Committee meetings (ASC) and the Ramp Inspections Coordination and Standardisation (RICS) meetings. As of 2010, EASA is also organising yearly the Industry & Regulators Forum in Cologne, whereby states and aviation industry representatives meet to discuss issues of common interest in the ramp inspections area.

EASA’s role in the EU Ramp Inspections Programme 
EASA is responsible for coordinating the RAMP inspections programme. The specific role and responsibilities of EASA in the EU Ramp Inspections Programme are:
 to collect by means of a centralised database the inspection reports of the Participating States engaged in the EU Ramp Inspections Programme;
 to develop, maintain and continuously update the centralised database;
 to provide necessary changes and enhancements to the database application;
 analyse all relevant information concerning the safety of aircraft and its operators;
 to report potential aviation safety problems to European Commission and all the Participating States;
 to advise the European Commission and all the Participating States on follow-up actions;
 to propose coordinated actions to the commission and to the competent authorities, when necessary on safety grounds, and ensure coordination at the technical level of such actions;
 to liaise with other European institutions and bodies, international organisations and third country competent authorities on information exchange.

National Coordinators 
National coordinators have been appointed by the competent authorities of all the Participating States. The main role of a national coordinator is to ensure the day-today coordination of the programme at national level in order to facilitate the appropriate implementation of the programme.

The specific tasks of  a national coordinator should include the following:
 entering ramp inspection reports into the centralised database;
 prioritising ramp inspections in accordance with the applicable provisions;
 nominating national representatives for the ramp inspection working groups;
 acting as a focal point for the training schedules (initial and recurrent training) for all involved national ramp inspection staff;
 ensuring that all staff involved in ramp inspections are properly trained and scheduled for recurrent training;
 representing the Member State at the meetings of the Ramp Inspections Coordination and Standardisation group (RICS) on ramp inspections;
 promoting and implementing the inspector exchange programme;
 providing support in handling requests for disclosure of data;
 ensuring distribution of new legislation and latest versions of procedures to ramp inspection staff;
 organising regular meetings with all ramp inspection staff to maintain a high quality standard;
 implementing a national ramp inspection quality control system;
 managing the access of national operators and the competent authority's staff to the centralised database;
 act as a sectorial focal point in the domain of ramp inspections in the context of standardisation activities performed by the Agency;
 proposing appropriate team members for ramp inspection standardisation visits;
 provide information to the Agency, the Commission and the Member States on contacts with authorities and operators.

Member States 

The 47 Participating States engaged in the EU Ramp Inspections Programme are: Albania, Armenia, Austria, Belgium, Bosnia and Herzegovina, Bulgaria, Canada, Croatia, Cyprus, Czech Republic, Denmark, Estonia, Finland, France, Georgia, Germany, Greece, Hungary, Iceland, India, Ireland, Israel, Italy, Latvia, Lithuania, Luxembourg, Malta, Republic of Moldova, Monaco, Montenegro, Morocco, Netherlands, Norway, Poland, Portugal, Romania, Serbia, Singapore, Slovak Republic, Slovenia, Spain, Sweden, Switzerland, The former Yugoslav Republic of Macedonia, Turkey, Ukraine, Saudi Arabia, United Arab Emirates and United Kingdom.

See also 

 European Aviation Safety Agency
 European Civil Aviation Conference
 Joint Aviation Authorities
 List of air carriers banned in the EU

External links 
 https://www.easa.europa.eu/easa-and-you/air-operations/ramp-inspection-programmes-safa-saca

Aviation in Europe
Aviation safety